In philosophy of science and philosophy of mind, cognitive closure is the proposition that human minds are constitutionally incapable of solving certain perennial philosophical problems. Owen Flanagan calls this position anti-constructive naturalism or the "new mysterianism" and the primary advocate of the hypothesis, Colin McGinn, calls it transcendental naturalism acknowledging the possibility that solutions may be knowable to an intelligent non-human of some kind. According to McGinn, such philosophical questions include the mind-body problem, identity of the self, foundations of meaning, free will, and knowledge, both a priori and empirical.

Colin McGinn

Friedrich Hayek
For Friedrich Hayek, "The whole idea of the mind explaining itself is a logical contradiction"... and "takes this incompleteness—the constitutional inability of mind to explain itself—to be a generalized case of Gödel's incompleteness theorem... Hayek is not a naturalistic agnostic, that is, the view that science currently cannot offer an explanation of the mind-body relationship, but in principle it could."

John Tyndall

Noam Chomsky
Noam Chomsky argues that the cognitive capabilities of all organisms are limited by biology and that certain problems may be beyond our understanding:

Phenomena and noumena
As argued in Kant's Critique of Pure Reason, human thinking is unavoidably structured by categories of the understanding:

These are ideas from which there is no escape and thus they pose a limit to thinking. What can be known through the categories is called "things for us" and what is outside the categories is unthinkable, called "things in themselves".

New mysterians

In his (famous) essay "What Is It Like to Be a Bat?" Thomas Nagel mentions the possibility of cognitive closure to the subjective character of experience and the (deep) implications that it has for materialist reductionist science. Owen Flanagan noted in his 1991 book Science of the Mind that some modern thinkers have suggested that consciousness will never be completely explained. Flanagan called them "the new mysterians" after the rock group Question Mark and the Mysterians. According to McGinn, the solution to the mind-body problem cannot be grasped, despite the fact that the solution is "written in our genes".

Emergent materialism is a similar but different claim that humans are not yet smart enough to determine the relationship between mind and matter.

See also
 Inquiry
 Reductionism
 Dialetheism
 Mystical experience
 Uncertainty
 Strong agnosticism is a religious application of a similar position.
 Epistemological nihilism
 Pyrrhonism

References

Problem solving
Concepts in epistemology
Philosophy of science
Naturalism (philosophy)
Knowledge
Philosophy of mind